Wicked Tuna: Outer Banks (previously known as Wicked Tuna: North vs. South) is an American reality television series about commercial tuna fishermen based in the Outer Banks who fish for the lucrative Atlantic bluefin tuna off the coast of North Carolina. The teams of fishermen battle each other to see who can catch the most fish, while trying to earn their livelihood.

In addition to offering an inside look at one of America's oldest industries, Wicked Tuna: Outer Banks also sheds light on important issues surrounding the fate of the bluefin tuna. Captains adhere to U.S. regulations that determine size limits and quotas for the season.

Wicked Tuna: Outer Banks is a spin-off of Wicked Tuna. Several vessels from the original show also appear in this version. Originally called Wicked Tuna: North vs. South, the name of the show was changed at the beginning of the second season. Season 6 began airing on June 23 and ended on October 6, 2019. The series was renewed for a seventh season on May 21, 2020.

Vessels

Current

Former

Episodes 

Seven complete seasons of Wicked Tuna: Outer Banks have aired.

Season winners

See also 
 Wicked Tuna
 Deadliest Catch
 Lobster Wars
 Whale Wars

References

External links 
 Wicked Tuna: Outer Banks at the National Geographic Channel
 

2014 American television series debuts
English-language television shows
Fishing television series
2010s American reality television series
Television shows set in North Carolina
Outer Banks
Reality television spin-offs
American television spin-offs